Founded in April 1887, the Aberdeenshire and District Football Association is an affiliated local association of the Scottish Football Association. Member clubs are drawn from the historic counties of Aberdeenshire, Banffshire and Kincardineshire.

Competitions
The association organises the annual Aberdeenshire Cup, Shield and League competitions.

Member clubs

Scottish Professional Football League
Aberdeen
Cove Rangers
Peterhead

Highland Football League
Buckie Thistle
Deveronvale
Formartine United
Fraserburgh
Huntly
Inverurie Loco Works
Keith
Turriff United

SJFA North Region
Aberdeen University
Banks o' Dee
Dyce Juniors
Hermes
Stonehaven

Links
ADFA website

References

Scottish Football Association
Football governing bodies in Scotland
Football in Aberdeen
Football in Aberdeenshire
Football in Moray